Christiania Torv is a former tram stop on the Oslo Tramway.

Located in Kvadraturen in downtown of Oslo, it was opened by Oslo Sporveier in 1994 as a part of the Vika Line. It was formerly served by line 12, before being closed in the late 2010s.

References 

Oslo Travel Guide

Oslo Tramway stations in Oslo